Dharanindravarman I was a king of the Khmer Empire, reigning from 1107 AD to 1113 AD. He ascended to the throne following the death of his younger brother, Jayavarman VI. He was married to Queen Vijayendralakshmi, former wife of Jayavarman VI. He was murdered in battle by his great-nephew, Suryavarman II. The event is supported by the Ban That inscription.

References

12th-century Cambodian monarchs
Khmer Empire
1113 deaths
Year of birth unknown